Nebria rasa is a species of ground beetle in the Nebriinae subfamily that is endemic to India, and can be found in such provinces as Sikkim and Darjeeling.

References

rasa
Beetles described in 1936
Beetles of Asia
Endemic fauna of India